"Oh! Frenchy" is a World War I song written by Sam Ehrlich and composed by Con Conrad. It was published in New York, New York by Broadway Music corporation in 1918. 
The song was in the top 20 charts from September 1918 to March 1919 and was number 2 in October, December, and February.  The sheet music cover features a soldier pictured in uniform with a woman in his heart.

References 

Bibliography
Parker, Bernard S. World War I Sheet Music.Vol 2 Jefferson: McFarland & Company, Inc., 2007. . 
Paas, John Roger. 2014. America sings of war: American sheet music from World War I. . 
Vogel, Frederick G. World War I Songs: A History and Dictionary of Popular American Patriotic Tunes, with Over 300 Complete Lyrics. Jefferson: McFarland & Company, Inc., 1995. . 

Songs about France
1918 songs
Songs of World War I
Songs with music by Con Conrad